Made of Glass may refer to:

 made of glass
 "Made of Glass" (KT Tunstall song), 2013
 "Made of Glass" (Kylie Minogue song), on a 2004 album and released as a single in 2005